Double Your Money was a British quiz show hosted by Hughie Green. Originally broadcast on Radio Luxembourg since 1950 and based on the American radio quiz Take It Or Leave It (1940–1947), it transferred to ITV in September 1955, a few days after the commercial channel began broadcasting. It was produced by Associated-Rediffusion until 1964 and then by Rediffusion London and it finished in 1968 when the company lost its franchise. There were 260 thirty-minute episodes.

Throughout its run the show was one of the most consistently popular programmes on British television. The quiz format was similar to The 64,000 Dollar Question, with prize money doubling at each question from £1 to a guarantee of £32 and multi-part answers being required at the harder stages. When contestants correctly answer a three-part question to reach the £1,000 Treasure Trail (£ as of ), they were placed in sound-proofed 'isolation booths', where the fans were turned off and the temperature grew, making contestants sweat and look nervous. The £64 question required two correct answers and the £128 question featured three parts. The remaining questions featured a four-part question for £256, a five-part question for £512 and a six-part question for the top prize of £1,000 (£1,024 at first). Only one contestant at a time could play the Treasure Trail.

The 8 November 1966 (air date) show came from The House of Friendship, Moscow, Russia, where Monica Rose and Natasha Vasylyeva were both hostesses and, because the Communist Party would not allow money to be given away, the big prize was a television set.

Female hostesses on the show included 18-year-old Valerie Drew and an elderly cleaner named Alice Earley who was taken on by Green after first appearing as a contestant. Nancy Roberts (1961–1965), Julie de Marco (1963–1965), Audrey Graham (1966-1968) and Monica Rose (1963–1968), a former accounts clerk from White City, London, a chirpy and popular teenage contestant who was also recruited by Green. She went on to host his next show The Sky's the Limit.

A feature of later shows was a section called "Beat Blackman" where viewers challenged previous contestant Roy Blackman on obscure sport trivia such as naming entire football squads in specific games, prompting Green to ask: "Who painted the goalposts?".

Directors included Eric Croall (1959–1962), Don Gale (1963 and 1964), Jim Pople (1965 and 1966), and Peter Croft (1967 and 1968). Robin Richmond played the organ from 1959 to 1967.
 1960, shown 7.30pm on Friday, the show ran for 15 weeks.
 1961, shown 7.30pm on Thursday, the show ran for 23 weeks.
 1962, shown 7.30pm on Thursday, the show ran for 40 weeks.
 1963, shown 7pm on Thursday, the show ran for 37 weeks.
 1964, shown 7pm on Thursday, the show ran for 38 weeks.
 1965, shown 7pm on Thursday, the show ran for 32 weeks
 1966, shown 7pm on Tuesday, the show ran for 37 weeks.
 1967, shown 7pm on Tuesday, the show ran for 18 weeks.
 1968, shown 7pm on Wednesday, the show ran for 29 weeks.

References

External links
 Review of Double Your Money
 

1955 British television series debuts
ITV game shows
1968 British television series endings
1950s British game shows
1960s British game shows
Black-and-white British television shows
Television series by ITV Studios
English-language television shows
Television shows produced by Associated-Rediffusion